Katie Robinson is an English footballer.

Katie Robinson may also refer to:

Katie Robinson, swimmer in S12 (classification)
Katie Robinson, candidate in British Columbia municipal elections, 2011
Katie Robinson, presenter on ITV News Channel TV

See also
Kate Robinson (disambiguation)
Katherine Robinson (disambiguation)